Chrysapace is a genus of ants in the subfamily Dorylinae containing four described species. The genus is distributed across the Malaysian peninsula, Indonesia, and the Philippines, with undescribed species from Madagascar and from Baltic amber Chrysapace was described by Crawley (1924) and later placed as a junior synonym of Cerapachys by Brown (1975).  Chrysapace was resurrected as a valid genus by Borowiec (2016) during redescription of the doryline genera.

Species

Chrysapace costatus 
Chrysapace jacobsoni 
Chrysapace merimbunensis 
Chrysapace sauteri

References

Dorylinae
Ant genera